Benjamin John Pimlott FBA (4 July 1945 – 10 April 2004), known as Ben Pimlott, was a British historian of the post-war period in Britain. He made a substantial contribution to the literary genre of political biography.

Early life
Pimlott was born on 4 July 1945. His father was John Pimlott, a civil servant at the Home Office and former private secretary to Herbert Morrison. He was educated at Rokeby School (at the time in Wimbledon), Marlborough College and Worcester College, Oxford, where he took a degree in Philosophy, Politics and Economics and a BPhil in politics, having originally won a scholarship to study there. In 1970, despite a pronounced stammer, he was appointed as a lecturer in the politics department of the University of Newcastle, where he also took his PhD. In the February 1974 general election, Pimlott contested Arundel on behalf of the Labour Party, and Cleveland and Whitby the following October. Having lost on both occasions, he also contested the 1979 election, after which he left the North East to take up a research post at the London School of Economics, moving to a lectureship at Birkbeck College, London in 1981.

Writing
During 1987–88, he was Political Editor of the New Statesman magazine and took on the post of Professor of Contemporary History at Birkbeck in 1988. For the following two years, Pimlott was responsible, with friends, for the short-lived journal Samizdat.

Aside from his attempts at a Parliamentary career in the 1970s, not to mention his tenure as Chairman of the Fabian Society in 1993/1994, Pimlott is best remembered for his works of political biography including the lives of Hugh Dalton (1985), Harold Wilson (1992), and a study of Queen Elizabeth II (1996). His study of Dalton won him the Whitbread Prize. 

His other books include Labour And The Left In The 1930s (1977), The Trade Unions In British Politics (with Chris Cook, 1982), Fabian Essays In Socialist Thought (1984), The Alternative (with Tony Wright and Tony Flower, 1990), Frustrate Their Knavish Tricks (1994) and Governing London (with Nirmala Rao, 2002).

Views and legacy
Many of Pimlott's theses have stood the test of time, even if they were marginally controversial when originally published. His studies of the 1930s Labour left, the life of Harold Wilson and the constitutional effect of the monarchy in post-war Britain are said to have made his reputation as a biographer and even bestowed some additional credibility upon the subjects, all of which have received critical accounts under the pen of others. Pimlott sincerely believed and argued consistently that the post-war consensus in British politics was a red-herring.

In 1996 his works were recognised with a Fellowship of the British Academy. At the time of his death from leukemia in 2004, he was Warden of Goldsmiths, University of London (since 1998). He had been married to Jean Seaton who lectures on communications and the media at the University of Westminster. Both of them in the 1980s - whilst 'readers' inhabiting the Reading Room of the British Library then still housed inside the British Museum to which, as a result of the mix-up, the playwright G.B.Shaw had contentiously willed a charitable gift by mistake  - could often be spotted together as incongruous academics amongst the tourists and serious visitors at the Museum Restaurant for a long lunch, to the envy of hurriedly queuing local office workers. Pre- and post-prandially, it was at his leisurely and unhurried pace - into and out of the Museum Shop - that towering Ben had been in the habit of sauntering, pensively and aloofly past the towering exhibits of the Egyptian Galleries. In 2005 the college named a major new Will Alsop-designed building on its New Cross site in his honour and also the same year the Fabian Society and The Guardian inaugurated the first annual Ben Pimlott Prize for Political Writing.

References

Sources
Julian Glover "Labour historian Pimlott dies at 58", The Guardian, 12 April 2004
D. R. Thorpe Obituary: Professor Ben Pimlott, The Independent, 14 April 2004.

1945 births
2004 deaths
Academics of Birkbeck, University of London
Academics of Goldsmiths, University of London
Academics of Newcastle University
Academics of the London School of Economics
Alumni of Newcastle University
Alumni of Worcester College, Oxford
Deaths from cancer in England
Deaths from leukemia
Fellows of the British Academy
Chairs of the Fabian Society
People educated at Marlborough College
People associated with Goldsmiths, University of London
20th-century British historians
Labour Party (UK) politicians